Central Westmoreland Career and Technology Center, or CWCTC, is located in New Stanton, Pennsylvania. CWCTC is a part-time Career and Technical Educational School with 10 sending school districts. Students also receive their Physical And Health Educations at the center and are also assigned a student-services counselor, according to their last name

Member School Districts and High Schools

Programs 
There are 23 programs at CWCTC, ranging from Cosmetology to Carpentry to Graphic Arts to Logistics.Other noteworthy programs are the Powerline Technology, Protective Services, and Horticulture and Masonry.

References 

Schools in Westmoreland County, Pennsylvania
Public high schools in Pennsylvania
Educational institutions established in 1963
1963 establishments in Pennsylvania